Carl Thompson may refer to:

 Carl Thompson (boxer) (born 1964), British boxer
 Carl Thompson (luthier) (born 1939), American luthier
 Carl Thompson (heavy person) (1981–2015), heaviest man in the United Kingdom
 Carl D. Thompson (1870–1949), American clergyman and politician from the Midwest
 Carl W. Thompson (1914–2002), American politician from Wisconsin

See also 
 Karl R. Thompson (born ), American constitutional lawyer
 Carl Gustaf Thomson (1824–1899), Swedish entomologist